Universal Soldier II: Brothers in Arms is a 1998 American made-for-television science fiction film directed by Jeff Woolnough and starring Matt Battaglia, Chandra West, Jeff Wincott, Andrew Jackson, and Gary Busey. It is the second installment in the Universal Soldier franchise and is a sequel to the 1992 film Universal Soldier. Despite featuring the same characters as the original, the film features none of the original cast or crew. It was followed in the same year by Universal Soldier III: Unfinished Business. In 1999, a theatrical sequel, once again starring Jean-Claude Van Damme, Universal Soldier: The Return was produced, which essentially ignored the plotline of the direct-to-video sequels entirely.

Plot
Following the events of the original Universal Soldier, the budget of the program has been cut by the government. However, under the orders of a CIA director, a gang of mercenaries take control of the new line of Universal Soldiers to use them in the diamond smuggling business.

Luc Deveraux, survivor of the first incident with the Universal Soldiers, continues to cause problems, while the enemy takes his newly found brother and news reporter Veronica Roberts prisoners.

Cast

 Matt Battaglia as Private Luc Deveraux
 Jeff Wincott as Eric Devereaux
 Andrew Jackson as Andrew Scott
 Eric Bryson as Peterson
 Kevin Rushton as Martinez
 Desmond Campbell as Cooper
 Michael Copeman as Lt. Col. Jack Cameron
 Gary Busey as Dr. Otto Mazur
 Burt Reynolds as CIA Deputy Director
 Richard McMillan as Dr. Walker
 Chandra West as Veronica Roberts
 Aron Tager as John Devereaux
 Barbara Gordon as Danielle Devereaux
 Carla Collins as Anchorwoman
 James Kee as Jasper
 Frank McAnulty as Purser
 Jared Wall as Luc at 9
 Neville Edwards as Porter
 Sophie Bennett as Annie
 Layton Morrison as Bodyguard
 Loren Peterson as Bodyguard
 Doug Murray as Young Dr. Gregor
 James Binkley as Sentry
 Randy Butcher as Sentry
 Michael Dyson as Sentry
 Jeffrey R. Smith as Control Operator
 Roy T. Anderson as Head Sentry
 Reg Dreger as Farmer
 Julian Richings as Bix
 James Kim as Sung Bodyguard
 Simon Kim as Sung Bodyguard

Production
In 1995, the embattled Carolco Pictures sold the television rights to its Universal Soldier franchise to Toronto-based Skyvision Entertainment. The Canadian company had a business strategy of turning successful theatrical films into television properties, and had already done so with RoboCop.
A series of four television films was considered. However, a change of ownership at Skyvision's parent company Labatt led to a scaling back of its entertainment endeavours. Former Skyvision executive Kevin Gillis revived the project at his new employer Catalyst Entertainment, in association with American outfit Durrant Fox Productions. The project was reformatted as a pair of television films, with eyes on a possible syndicated series.

The film recasts former professional gridiron football player Matt Battaglia as Luc Deveraux, and introduces a long-lost brother named Eric Deveraux, played by Canadian actor and martial artist Jeff Wincott.

Brothers in Arms picks up right at the end of the original Universal Soldier, with the final fight from that film re-enacted by Battaglia and Andrew Jackson (in a brief appearance as Andrew Scott/GR13). It then introduces a new primary villain, security expert Otto Mazur, played by Gary Busey. Burt Reynolds appears in a limited capacity as overarching antagonist "Mentor", who takes greater importance in the sequel, Unfinished Business.

The "Mentor" role was cast only a few days before the shoot, and Reynolds agreed to join the production on short notice as a favor to Battaglia. The veteran actor was a friend of Battaglia's father Carmello, with whom he played college football, and recommended his son try acting. Battaglia, to whom Reynolds was a real-life mentor, had previously supported the star on several shows he headlined. Battaglia described the filming of Universal Soldier as an overall smooth experience, with the notable exception of his relationship with Busey, whom he found difficult to work with.

Brothers in Arms and Unfinished Business were primarily shot in Southern Ontario over 42 days spread between 27 October and 23 December 1997. Downsview Military Base was used as the UniSols' operations center. Both pictures were shot concurrently, with the schedule alternating between scenes from each film. The two sequels had an aggregate budget of $10.7 million.

Release
Universal Soldier II: Brothers in Arms premiered on cable television via The Movie Channel, a sister channel of Showtime, on 27 September 1998. It was released on VHS by Paramount Home Video on 22 June 1999. According to Battaglia, Universal Soldier II and III—or a combination of both—were at some point considered to become Showtime's first theatrical releases, before they reverted to TV premieres.

Brothers in Arms received a 2002 DVD release by TVA Films in Canada, as part of a double feature that also includes the next installment Unfinished Business.

Some German home video versions of the film are sold as Neu Bearbeitete Fassung (Newly Edited Version), but this merely indicates that they are cut for violence.

Reception

Critical response
Review aggregator Rotten Tomatoes gives the film a 0% approval rating based on 7 reviews, with an average rating of 4.02/10.
Ballantine Books' Video Movie Guide called the film a "boring by-the-numbers" effort, rating it a two on a scale of one to five. VideoHound rated it a two on a scale of zero to four.

The film received additional reviews from specialized genre outlets, although they were equally lackluster. The Action Elite called the film "boring" and "lifeless", while Bulletproof Action lambasted its "sluggish" pacing.
Dubbious artistic choices were also singled out: Moria Reviews branded the flashy editing as "pretentious", and deemed the soundtrack "inappropriate". The  Action Elite similarly found the music "appalling". Outlaw Vern was more positive, and argued that such stylistic flourishes at least showed an attempt at making the film stand out.

Battaglia's turn as Devereaux was found to lack charisma, with Vern saying that his performance made fellow football player turned actor Howie Long "look like Jeremy Irons."

The film did receive some moderate praise for being a direct continuation of the events of the first film, rather than a bare-bones reimagining like most television adaptations.

References

External links
 
 

1998 television films
1998 films
1990s science fiction action films
1990s English-language films
American science fiction action films
Showtime (TV network) films
Television sequel films
Universal Soldier (film series)
Films about the United States Army
Films directed by Jeff Woolnough
1990s American films